Middle Ages is an American comedy-drama television series created by Stan Rogow, that aired on CBS from September 3 until October 1, 1992.

Premise
Residents of a suburb of Chicago deal with their mid-life traumas.

Cast
Peter Riegert as Walter Cooper
William Russ as Terry Hannon
Ashley Crow as Cindy Nelson Cooper
Michael O'Keefe as Ron Steffey
James Gammon as Dave Nelson
Amy Brenneman as Blanche
Alex McKenna as Hillary Cooper
Ryan McWhorter as Carson Cooper
Kyle Secor as Brian Conover
Maria Pitillo as Robin

Episodes

References

External links

1992 American television series debuts
1992 American television series endings
1990s American comedy-drama television series
English-language television shows
CBS original programming
Television series by CBS Studios
Television shows set in Cook County, Illinois
Television shows set in Chicago